Dan Ryan (born June 21, 1962) is an American non-profit executive and politician who was elected to the Portland City Council on August 12, 2020. Ryan defeated Multnomah County Commissioner Loretta Smith in a runoff election to succeed Nick Fish, who died of stomach cancer on January 2, 2020. Ryan will serve for the remainder of Fish's term, which ends in 2022.

Early life and education 
Ryan was born in North Portland, Oregon, the youngest of eight children. Ryan was the first in his family to graduate from college. Ryan earned a Bachelor of Arts degree from the University of Oregon and took graduate courses at The New School.

Career 
Prior to announcing his candidacy for Portland City Council, Ryan worked as an administrator at Portland State University, where he managed the school's first capital campaign.

Ryan served as a member of the Portland School Board from 2005 to 2008, and was the CEO of All Hands Raised, an education non-profit, from 2008 to 2019. Ryan is the third LGBT person elected as a commissioner of Portland, and the first to have been diagnosed with HIV. Upon his election in August, Ryan called for an end to the 2020 Portland protests and committed to establishing a "peace summit" between local politicians and activists. Ryan assumed office on September 9, 2020.

During his campaign, Ryan was endorsed by City Commissioner Jo Ann Hardesty and former Governor Barbara Roberts.

Personal life 
While living in New York City in 1986, Ryan was diagnosed with HIV. In 1996, Ryan was diagnosed with pneumocystis and was given between six months and a year to live. He then returned from Seattle, where he was living at the time, to his hometown of Portland, Oregon, expecting to die soon.

References 

1962 births
21st-century American politicians
Living people
American LGBT city council members
Oregon Democrats
People with HIV/AIDS
Portland City Council members (Oregon)
School board members in Oregon
University of Oregon alumni
21st-century LGBT people